Brás Viegas (Blasius de Viegas) (1553–1599) was a Portuguese Jesuit, known as a biblical commentator.

Life
He was born in Évora, and entered the Society of Jesus in 1569. He became a teacher at Coimbra and the University of Évora, where he was granted a doctorate in 1594.

Works
Commentarii exegetici in Apocalypsim (1601) 
The book became well known; in it Viegas expressed his expectation for spiritual renewal led by the Society of Jesus. There were later editions, edited by Odoardo Farnese. It was translated into Ge'ez by Jesuit missionaries.

Meditações sobre os mysterios da paixam, resurreiçam, e acensaõ de Christo Nosso Senhor (1601)
By the Jesuit Vincenzo Bruno (1532–1594).

Further reading
 PDF

Notes

1553 births
1599 deaths
16th-century Portuguese Jesuits
People from Évora
Portuguese biblical scholars